Zischgeles is a summit in the Stubai Alps in the Austrian state of Tyrol.

Climbing 
The normal route starts from Praxmar and is an alpine mountain hike without glacier travel. Only the last part of the track close to the summit might require the use of hands. The Zischgeles is considered an easy three-thousander.

Ski tours are common at the Zischgeles in wintertime.

References 

Alpine three-thousanders
Mountains of the Alps